Natalí Doreski (born 19 January 1980) is a former field hockey player from Argentina, who played as a forward.

Career

Under–21
In 2001, Natalí Doreski was a member of the Argentina U–21 at the FIH Junior World Cup in Buenos Aires. At the tournament, Argentina finished in second place, taking home a silver medal.

Las Leonas
Doreski made her debut for the Las Leonas in 2001.

Throughout her career, Doreski won numerous medals; most notably gold at the 2002 FIH World Cup and the 2003 Pan American Games.

References

External links

1980 births
Living people
Argentine female field hockey players
Female field hockey forwards
Argentine sportswomen
Pan American Games medalists in field hockey
Pan American Games gold medalists for Argentina
Field hockey players at the 2003 Pan American Games
Medalists at the 2003 Pan American Games
Field hockey players from Buenos Aires
21st-century Argentine women